COVID-19 pandemic in Dakota may refer to:

 COVID-19 pandemic in North Dakota
 COVID-19 pandemic in South Dakota